Bruce Walsh (born ) is a contemporary American playwright and a prominent Philadelphia fringe artist. His works have received attention due to their unique brand of site-specific theater. In addition to theater, he is regular contributor to the Philadelphia Metro (Philadelphia), a free city paper.

Career 
His plays have been workshopped or produced by The Philadelphia Theatre Company, New Dramatists, 1812 Productions, Montgomery Theatre Project, Crescendo Theatre Company, Temple Theaters, Brat Productions, Alleyway Theatre, and Kaibutsu. While attending Temple University's Theater Program, Bruce was a Bernard B. Jacobs Intern at New Dramatists in NYC and worked extensively as a Teaching Artist for The Philadelphia Young Playwrights Festival. After graduating from Temple in 2001, he joined the legendary Philly Fringe company, Brat Productions, working as a Dramaturg, Playwright and Director. In 2004 he co-founded Kaibutsu, a Philadelphia based guerrilla theater group, which has enjoyed praise from NPR, WRTI, The City Paper, Philadelphia Weekly, The Philadelphia Inquirer and many others for its unique brand of site-specific theater.

He has been nominated for an Independence Foundation Fellowship.

Plays 
Whiskey Neat (2009)
Old Bill (2005)
Northern Liberty (2005 Philadelphia Live Arts Festival)
The Guided Tour (2004 and 2006 Philadelphia Live Arts Festival) - A curious site-specific play on a tourist trolley—was presented in the 2004 and 2006 Live Arts Festivals. "Guided Tour DUI" is a rare experiment between the creators of the show and Project P, a collective of local film enthusiasts. With the help of the P's, the cast of "Guided" perform a reading of the show with a film adaptation of the tour route projected behind them—and sometimes on them. Performed at the Mum Puppet Theatre.
Dasein (2002 Philly Fringe Festival)
The Wounded Body (2000 Philly Fringe Festival)
Once (Co-written with Madi Distefano of Brat Productions, 2002)

Notes
 Philadelphia Inquirer review of Whiskey Neat
 Philadelphia Weekly review of "Whiskey Neat"

References

External links 
 Kaibutsu Theater Company web site.
 Philadelphia Live Arts Festival Interview - Co-creators of The Guided Tour, Bruce Walsh and Dan Scholnick talk about the 2006 production of the play.

Living people
American dramatists and playwrights
Year of birth missing (living people)